Fishercap Lake is located in Glacier National Park, in the U. S. state of Montana. Mount Wilbur is west of Fishercap Lake. The lake is almost adjacent to the Swiftcurrent Auto Camp Historic District.

See also
List of lakes in Glacier County, Montana

References

Lakes of Glacier National Park (U.S.)
Lakes of Glacier County, Montana